

The Avia BH-11 was a two-seat sport aircraft built in Czechoslovakia in 1923, a further development of the Avia BH-9. The main changes in this version involved a redesign of the forward fuselage. 15 examples were ordered by the Czechoslovakian Army as trainers and general liaison aircraft, and operated under the military designation B.11.

Six years after the BH-11 first flew, a new version was produced for the civil market as the BH-11B Antelope. This replaced the original Walter NZ 60 45 kW (60 hp) engine with a Walter Vega of 63 kW (85 hp) and was built in small numbers.

As a further development, the BH-11C retained the original engine but the wingspan was increased by 1.4 m (4 ft 6 in).

A BH-11A and a BH-11C are preserved at the Prague Aviation Museum, Kbely.

Specifications (BH-11)

See also

References

Further reading
 
 
 

1920s Czechoslovakian sport aircraft
BH-11
Low-wing aircraft
Single-engined tractor aircraft
Aircraft first flown in 1923